Matthew Underwood may refer to:
 Matthew Underwood, an American actor who portrayed Logan Reese in the Nickelodeon television series Zoey 101
 Matt Underwood, an American sportscaster